Banbury Oaks  is a neighborhood in Pasadena, California. It is bordered by Washington Boulevard to the north, Mountain Street to the south, Fair Oaks Avenue to the East, and Forest Avenue to the west. The neighborhood is bisected by I-210. The main roads through the neighborhood are Hammond Street and Lincoln Avenue.

Landmarks
Most of the commercial development in the neighborhood is on Fair Oaks and Lincoln Avenues, on either side of the neighborhood. Jackie Robinson Park is located on Fair Oaks and Hammond, and his childhood home is nearby.

On the east side of Sunset Avenue from Glorieta Avenue to Hammond Avenue the three houses are not part of the Banbury Oaks Landmark District. These neighbors chose not be included in the History Landmark status of the Banbury Oaks Landmark district in the city of Pasadena.

The Pasadena Historic Preservation Commission also covers the Banbury Oaks district.

Education
Banbury Oaks is served by Cleveland Elementary School in Muir Heights, Washington Middle School in La Pintoresca Park, Pasadena, California, and Muir High School in Muir Heights.

Transportation
Banbury Oaks is served by Metro Local lines 256, 660 and 662, as well as Pasadena Transit routes 31, 32, 51, and 52.

Banbury Oaks Neighborhood Association
Banbury Oaks Neighborhood Association, Pasadena, CA 91103, sets its boundaries at- Sunset Ave. between Claremont St. & Mountain St. including 1/2 block of Claremont; St. Between Glen Ave. & Sunset Ave.

References

External links

 Pasadena City Council Agenda 

Neighborhoods in Pasadena, California